The Hitchcock Heights are a mostly ice-covered mountain mass,  high, between Maitland Glacier and Apollo Glacier at the south side of Mobiloil Inlet, on the east coast of the Antarctic Peninsula. They were discovered and photographed by Sir Hubert Wilkins on his flight of December 20, 1928, and rephotographed by Lincoln Ellsworth in 1935. The feature was named by the Advisory Committee on Antarctic Names in 1952 for Charles B. Hitchcock of the American Geographical Society, who by utilizing these photographs assisted in constructing the first reconnaissance map of this area.

References

Mountains of Graham Land
Bowman Coast